Kat or KAT may  refer to:

People
 Kat Alano (born 1985), Anglo-Filipino model, actress, and television presenter/VJ in the Philippines
 Kat Ashley (c1502–1565), governess to Queen Elizabeth I
 Kat Bjelland (born 1963), American musician
 Kat Blaque (born 1990), American YouTuber, activist, and artist
 Kat Cressida (born 1968), American actress
 Kat DeLuna (born 1987), singer-songwriter
 Kat Foster (born 1978), American actress
 Kat Graham (born 1989), American actress, singer, songwriter, record producer, dancer, and model
 Kat Stewart (born 1972), Australian actress
 Kat Swift (fl. 2008), American politician and activist
 Karl-Anthony Towns (born 1995), American basketball player
 Kat Von D (born 1982), tattoo artist
 The Great Kat, metal guitarist and violinist
 Kat Dennings, stage name of American actress Katherine Victoria Litwack (born 1986)
 The Kat, stage name of Stacy Carter (born 1970), former professional wrestling personality

Fictional characters
 Kat (Battlestar Galactica), a pilot in the 2004 Battlestar Galactica TV series
 Kat (Gravity Rush), the protagonist of the Gravity Rush series
 Kat Hillard, from the Power Rangers TV series
 Kat Slater, from the BBC soap opera EastEnders
 Karate Kat, the main character of the same-named cartoon TV series
 Krazy Kat, an American comic strip character
 DJ Kat, the main character in the puppet children's TV series The DJ Kat Show
 Doctor Katherine "Kat" Manx, from the Power Rangers TV series
 Kat, a cybernetic alien in the Canadian animated TV series Kid vs. Kat
 Kat, a recurring character in the Disney Channel TV show The Ghost and Molly McGee
 Kats, anthropomorphic cats in the cartoon series SWAT Kats: The Radical Squadron
 Kat Ryan, a supporting character in the Max Steel franchise
 Kat Jennings, a character from The Final Destination franchise
 Kat Stratford, from the movie 10 Things I Hate About You
 Catherine-B320 (nicknamed Kat), a non-player character in the Halo: Reach video game

Places
 Kat, Kohgiluyeh and Boyer-Ahmad, Iran
 Kat, Mazandaran, Iran
 Kat, Razavi Khorasan, Iran
 Kąt, Stalowa Wola County, Poland
 Kąt, Tarnobrzeg County, Poland

Transportation
 KAT metro station, a train station in Kifissia, Greece
 Kai Tak station (MTR station code: KAT), Hong Kong
 Kaitaia Airport (IATA: KAT), New Zealand
 Kato Airline (ICAO: KAT), a defunct Norwegian airline
 Knoxville Area Transit, the operator of public transportation in Knoxville, Tennessee, U.S.

Other uses
 Kat (band), a Polish heavy metal music group
 KATS, an FM radio station licensed to Yakima, Washington
 , a cultivar of Karuka
 Kat, floor in Turkish postal addresses
 Katal (symbol: kat), the SI unit of measurement for catalytic activity
 Acetyl-CoA C-acyltransferase, an enzyme
 Kearsarge Arts Theatre Company, a non-profit summer program for children interested in the arts
 KickassTorrents, also known as KAT, a BitTorrent search engine
 Kleene algebra with tests
 Team Katusha (ICU code KAT), a Russian bicycle racing team

See also
 
 
 Kat O, an island in northeast Hong Kong territory
 De Kat (disambiguation)
 Cat (disambiguation)
 Kats (disambiguation)
 Khat, a plant
 Kät (disambiguation)